Thomas Seir Cummings (1804–1894) was an English-American miniature painter and author.

Biography
Thomas Seir Cummings was born at Bath, England on August 26, 1804.  He came to New York early in life and studied there with Henry Inman.  He painted miniatures in water color, and many of his sitters were well-known contemporaries of the artist.  In 1826 he helped to found the National Academy of Design, was its treasurer for many years and one of its early vice presidents.  He also wrote an account of its history, entitled Historic Annals of the National Academy from its Foundation to 1865 (Philadelphia, 1865).  His later life was spent in Connecticut, and Hackensack, N. J.

He died in Hackensack on September 24, 1894.

References

External links
Art and the empire city: New York, 1825-1861, an exhibition catalog from The Metropolitan Museum of Art (fully available online as PDF), which contains material on Thomas Seir Cummings (see index)
 

19th-century American painters
American male painters
Artists from Bath, Somerset
1804 births
1894 deaths
English emigrants to the United States
American portrait painters
Painters from New York City
Portrait miniaturists
19th-century American writers
National Academy of Design people
19th-century American male writers
19th-century American male artists